Xuankou is a town located in Wenchuan County, Ngawa, Sichuan, China. , it has one residential community and 16 villages under its administration.

2008 Sichuan earthquake 
Xuankou was one of the three most severely damaged areas of the 2008 Sichuan earthquake.

Notes 

Towns in Sichuan
Wenchuan County